James Michael Palmer (1927 - 21 December 2022), known as Mixie Palmer,  was an Irish Gaelic footballer who played for club side Killarney Legion and at inter-county level with the Kerry senior football team.

Career

Born in Kenmare, County Kerry, Palmer played at club level with Killarney Legion and won a County Championship medal in 1946. He first appeared on the inter-county scene as a member of the Cork minor football team in 1945 before subsequently winning an All-Ireland Junior Championship medal with Kerry in 1949. Palmer's performances in this grade resulted in an immediate call-up to the senior team and he won the first of five Munster Championship medals in 1950. He claimed his first All-Ireland title after a defeat of Armagh in the 1953 All-Ireland final. After defeat by Meath the following year, Palmer collected a second winners' medal after lining out at left corner-back in Kerry's defeat of Dublin in the 1955 All-Ireland final.

Honours

Killarney Legion
Kerry Senior Football Championship: 1946

Kerry
All-Ireland Senior Football Championship: 1953, 1955
Leinster Senior Football Championship: 1950, 1951, 1953, 1954, 1955
All-Ireland Junior Football Championship: 1949
Munster Junior Football Championship: 1949

References

External links
Mixie Palmer profile at the Terrace Talk website

1927 births
2022 deaths
Killarney Legion Gaelic footballers
Kerry inter-county Gaelic footballers
Munster inter-provincial Gaelic footballers